McQueen, Mcqueen, MacQueen or Macqueen may refer to:

Clan Macqueen, a Scottish clan
McQueen (surname), including a list of people named McQueen, Mcqueen, MacQueen or Macqueen
McQueen McIntosh (1822–1868), United States and Confederate judge
McQueen (band), all-female rock band from Brighton, England
McQueen (film), a 2018 British documentary film about designer Alexander McQueen
McQueen (TV series), Canadian series in 1969–70
McQueen, Edmonton, a neighbourhood of the city of Edmonton, Alberta, Canada
McQueen, Oklahoma, an unincorporated settlement
McQueen (play), a 2015 play by James Phillips and directed by John Caird